The 2006 season of the Palau Soccer League was the third season of association football competition in Palau. Surangel and Sons Company won the championship, their first title.

References

Palau Soccer League seasons
Palau
Soccer